Bohumil is a Slavic male given name. It means "favoured by God" from the Slavic elements bog (god) and mil (favour). Nicknames are Bob, Bobby, Bohouš, Bohoušek, Bohuš, Mila, Milek, Bogie, Boga, Bozha. Other forms are Bogumił, Bogomil, Bogolyub. Feminine versions are Bohumila, Bogumiła, Bogumila and Bogomila.

Name days 
Czech: 3 October
Slovak: 3 March
Polish: 13 January, 18 January, 26 February, 10 June or 3 November

Notable bearers 
 Bogumilus (1135?–1204?), Archbishop of Gniezno and hermit
 Bohumil Brhel (born 1965), Czech speedway rider
 Bohumil Cepák (1951–2021), Czech former handball player
 Bohumil Doležal (born 1940), Czech literary critic, politician and former dissident
 Bohumil Durdis (1903–1983), Czech weightlifter
 Bohumil Golián (1931–2012), Slovak former volleyball player
 Bohumil Hrabal (1914–1997), Czech writer
 Bohumil Janoušek (born 1937), Czech rower
 Bohumil Kafka (1878–1942), Czech sculptor and pedagogue
 Bogumił Kobiela (1931–1969), Polish film actor
 Bohumil Kubišta (1884–1918), Czech painter and art critic
 Bohumil Kučera (1874–1921), Czech physicist
 Bohumil Kudrna (1920–1991), Czechoslovak flatwater canoer
 Bohumil Laušman (1903–1963), Czech politician
 Bohumil Makovsky (1878–1950), American band leader from Austro-Hungary
 Bohumil Mathesius (1888–1952), Czech poet, translator, publicist and literary scientist
 Bohumil Modrý (1916–1963), Czech ice hockey goaltender
 Bohumil Mořkovský (1899–1928), Czech gymnast
 Bohumil Müller (1915–1987), Jehovah's Witnesses religious leader in Czechoslovakia during and after World War II
 Bohumil Němeček (1938–2010), Czechoslovak welterweight boxer
 Bohumil Shimek (1861–1937), American naturalist, conservationist and professor
 Bohumil Staša (1944–2019), Czech former Grand Prix motorcycle road racer
 Bohumil Veselý (born 1945), Czech footballer

See also
Slavic names
Bogomil (name)
Bogomilism

External links 
Bohumil -> Behind the Name
Bohumil -> E-Svatek

Masculine given names
Czech masculine given names
Slovak masculine given names
Bulgarian masculine given names
Slavic masculine given names